David Holden is an American television producer and television writer. His producing and writing credits include Undressed, The War at Home, Accidentally on Purpose, Shake It Up, and Young & Hungry, which he created.

References

External links

American television producers
American television writers
American male television writers
Living people
Place of birth missing (living people)
Year of birth missing (living people)